Allysha Lyn Chapman (born January 25, 1989) is a Canadian professional soccer player who plays as a left-back for National Women's Soccer League club Houston Dash and the Canada national team.

College career
Chapman played college soccer for UAB in 2007 and for LSU from 2009 to 2011.

Club career

Houston Dash
Chapman joined the Dash in 2015 after playing the previous three seasons in Sweden. After two seasons in Houston, she was traded to the Boston Breakers on November 28, 2016.

Boston Breakers
Chapman appeared in 19 games in what would be her only season in Boston, as the team would fold ahead of the 2018 season.

North Carolina Courage
Chapman was selected by the Courage with the 10th pick in the 2018 Dispersal Draft. After seeing very minimal playing time with the Courage, she was traded to the Houston Dash on May 9.

Return to Houston Dash
Chapman made her return to the Dash on May 15, against the Chicago Red Stars.

International career
Chapman was part of the Canada national under-20 team that won the 2008 CONCACAF Women's U-20 Championship.

She made her debut for the Canada national team on October 25, 2014.

Chapman scored her first goal for Canada against Italy at the 2015 Cyprus Women's Cup.

Chapman was named to Canada's roster for the 2015 FIFA Women's World Cup. She played every minute of Canada's five matches. Canada was eliminated by England in the quarterfinals.

Chapman was named to Canada's roster for the 2016 CONCACAF Olympic Qualifier, where Canada finished second and qualified for the 2016 Summer Olympics. She won the 2016 Algarve Cup and was named to Canada's Olympic Team. Chapman played in five of Canada's six games at the Olympic Games, winning the Bronze Medal.

On May 25, 2019, she was named to the roster for the 2019 FIFA Women's World Cup.

Chapman was named to the roster for Canada's 2020 Olympic Team. Chapman played in four of Canada's six games at the Olympic Games, winning the Gold Medal.

Career statistics

College

Club

International
As of February 19, 2023

International goals
Scores and results list Canada's goal tally first.

Honours
Houston Dash

 NWSL Challenge Cup: 2020
Canada U20

CONCACAF Women's U-20 Championship: 2008

Canada
Summer Olympics: 2021; bronze medal: 2016
CONCACAF Women's Olympic Qualifier runner-up: 2016
 Algarve Cup: 2016; runner-up 2017

References

External links

 
 Boston Breakers player profile
Twitter Profile

1989 births
Living people
Soccer people from Ontario
Sportspeople from Oshawa
Canadian people of Scottish descent
Women's association football defenders
Canada women's international soccer players
Canadian women's soccer players
Canadian expatriate women's soccer players
Canadian expatriate sportspeople in Sweden
Expatriate women's footballers in Sweden
Canadian expatriate sportspeople in the United States
Expatriate women's soccer players in the United States
UAB Blazers women's soccer players
LSU Tigers women's soccer players
Vancouver Whitecaps FC (women) players
USL W-League (1995–2015) players
Eskilstuna United DFF players
Damallsvenskan players
Houston Dash players
Boston Breakers players
North Carolina Courage players
National Women's Soccer League players
Footballers at the 2016 Summer Olympics
Olympic soccer players of Canada
Olympic bronze medalists for Canada
Olympic medalists in football
Medalists at the 2016 Summer Olympics
2015 FIFA Women's World Cup players
2019 FIFA Women's World Cup players
Footballers at the 2020 Summer Olympics
Medalists at the 2020 Summer Olympics
Olympic gold medalists for Canada